The 2015 Spa-Francorchamps GP2 Series round was a GP2 Series motor race held on August 22 and 23, 2015 at Circuit de Spa-Francorchamps, Belgium. It was the seventh round of the 2015 GP2 Series. The race supported the 2015 Belgian Grand Prix.

Classification

Qualifying

Feature race

Sprint race

See also 
 2015 Belgian Grand Prix
 2015 Spa-Francorchamps GP3 Series round

References 

Spa-Francorchamps
GP2